Dactyloceras canui is a moth in the family Brahmaeidae. It was described by Thierry Bouyer in 2002. It is found in Equatorial Guinea and possibly Kenya.

References

Brahmaeidae
Moths described in 2002